Alicia Gironella D'Angeli (born 18 January 1931) is a Mexican chef and gastronomic researcher. She has published many cook books.

See also
Mexican cuisine

External links

References

Living people
Mexican chefs
Mexican people of Italian descent
People from Mexico City
1931 births